CNA, formerly known as the CNA Corporation, is a federally-funded nonprofit research and analysis organization based in Arlington County, Virginia. CNA has around 625 employees.

General
CNA operates:

 The Center for Naval Analyses. CNA's Center for Naval Analyses is the federally funded research and development center (FFRDC) for the United States Navy and Marine Corps. It also provides research and analysis services to other military and government agencies to help improve the efficiency and effectiveness of U.S. national defense efforts. It has seven divisions: Advanced Technology & Systems Analysis, China Studies, Resource Analysis, the Marine Corps Program, the Operations Evaluation Group, the Center for Strategic Studies, and the Special Operations Program. These divisions address issues of preparedness, operations evaluation, systems analysis, foreign affairs, strategic relationships, humanitarian operations, logistics, and manpower.

Through the Center’s Field Program, approximately 50 analysts are assigned to Navy, Marine Corps, and Joint Commands around the world. Assignments range from carrier strike groups and Marine expeditionary forces to the U.S. Pacific Command. Field analysts are included in all functions of the command and provide real-time analytical support on operational problems of immediate concern to the military.

Mark Geis, formerly vice president and director of CNA's Operations Evaluation Group and of CNA's Marine Corps Program, became the executive vice president of CNA's Center for Naval Analyses in 2015.

Past presidents of the Center for Naval Analyses include Dr. Paul Speer, an oceanographer who is now with the Marine Biological Laboratory in Woods Hole, Massachusetts, and Christine H. Fox, who, in 2014, served as acting deputy secretary of Defense before retiring from the Pentagon and joining the Johns Hopkins University Applied Physics Laboratory.

 The Institute for Public Research. CNA's Institute for Public Research conducts research and analysis on domestic policy issues for federal, state, and local government agencies, including the United States Department of Homeland Security, the United States Department of Justice, the Federal Emergency Management Agency, the Federal Aviation Administration, and the United States Department of Education. It has four divisions: Education; Energy, Water, & Climate; Enterprise Systems and Data Analysis; and Safety & Security.
 The Military Advisory Board. The CNA Military Advisory Board is an American defense advisory group composed of retired three-star and four-star generals and admirals from the Army, Navy, Air Force, and Marine Corps that studies pressing issues of the day to assess their impact on America's national security.

History

CNA traces its origins to the Antisubmarine Warfare Operations Group (ASWORG), formed in 1942 to assist the U.S. Navy with scientific advice for finding and attacking U-boats that were sinking commercial ships off the Atlantic coast of North America. Massachusetts Institute of Technology physics Professor Philip M. Morse founded ASWORG at the request of Capt. Wilder D. Baker, then commander of the Antisubmarine Warfare Unit of the Atlantic Fleet. Morse is considered the father of operations research in the United States. By the end of World War II, the organization had expanded to almost 80 scientists serving on eight military bases in the Atlantic and Pacific as well as at the Washington, D.C. headquarters. They advised U.S. forces on air, antiaircraft, submarine, amphibious, and antisubmarine operations. Though the group served the military, it was designed to be civilian and independent in order to preserve the objectivity of its analysis, and was administered by Columbia University.

In 1945, the Department of the Navy decided to support the continuation of the group under the name the Operations Evaluation Group (OEG), which exists to this day as a division within CNA. OEG grew rapidly during the Korean War, during which one of its analysts, Irving Shaknov, was killed in combat. In 1962, OEG was merged with smaller naval advisory groups to form the Center for Naval Analyses. The first ongoing analysis support program for a non-defense agency began in 1991 for the Federal Aviation Administration. All non-defense work at CNA was brought together under its Institute for Public Research in 1993, with the Center for Naval Analyses remaining as the other division of CNA.

Leadership

Katherine A.W. McGrady, Ph.D. is President and Chief Executive Officer of CNA. She was previously CNA's Chief Operating Officer.

Board of Trustees
 Maura Harty, Chair
 Lieutenant General Robert R. Blackman Jr., USMC (Ret.)
 Vice Admiral William R. Burke, USN (Ret.)
 Daniel A. Domenech
 Admiral Mark E. Ferguson III USN (Ret.)
 Carol Graham
 Katherine A.W. McGrady
 Vice Admiral Adam M. Robinson Jr., USN (Ret.)
 Laurie O. Robinson
 Sarah Sewall
 Sean Stackley
 Roderick K. von Lipsey

References

External links
 

Non-profit corporations
Research and development in the United States
Federally Funded Research and Development Centers
Non-profit organizations based in Arlington, Virginia